The white-bearded greenbul (Criniger ndussumensis), is a species of songbird in the bulbul family, Pycnonotidae. It is found from south-eastern Nigeria and western Cameroon to eastern Democratic Republic of the Congo and extreme north-western Angola. Its natural habitat is subtropical or tropical moist lowland forests.

Taxonomy and systematics
The white-bearded greenbul was originally described as a subspecies of the red-tailed greenbul and alternatively has been considered as conspecific with the yellow-bearded greenbul. Alternate names for the white-bearded greenbul include the slender-billed bearded bulbul, Uganda red-tailed bulbul and white-bearded bulbul.

References

Criniger
Birds of Central Africa
Birds described in 1904
Taxonomy articles created by Polbot